Malswick Halt was a request stop on the former Ledbury and Gloucester Railway. It opened on 1st February 1938 and was closed in 1959 when the line was closed to passengers.

References

Further reading

Disused railway stations in Gloucestershire
Former Great Western Railway stations
Railway stations in Great Britain opened in 1938
Railway stations in Great Britain closed in 1959
Newent